Blytheville School District #5 is a school district based in Blytheville, Arkansas, United States. BSD provides early childhood, elementary and secondary education to more than 2,900 students in prekindergarten through grade 12. The district employs more than 500 faculty and staff at its seven schools. The district encompasses  of land in Mississippi County.

The district serves most of Blytheville and all of Burdette.

History
The Burdette school district merged into the Blytheville district in 1971.

Schools
Secondary education
 Blytheville High School, serving grades 9 through 12.
 Blytheville Middle School, serving grades 6 through 8.
 Blytheville Charter School & Alternative Learning Community, serving grades 7 through 12.
Early childhood and elementary education
 Blytheville Elementary School, serving grades 3 through 5.
 Blytheville Primary School, serving grades 1 and 2.
 Blytheville Kindergarten Center, serving prekindergarten and kindergarten.

References

External links
 

Education in Mississippi County, Arkansas
School districts in Arkansas
Blytheville, Arkansas